Dong Yueqian (1914–1978) was a Chinese diplomat. He was Ambassador of the People's Republic of China to Sweden (1959–1964).

1914 births
1978 deaths
Ambassadors of China to Sweden
People's Republic of China politicians from Beijing
National University of Peking alumni